The sago monitor or torch monitor (Varanus obor) is a species of monitor lizards endemic to the Indonesian island of Sanana.

Description
Varanus obor is the only melanistic member of the Pacific monitor (V. indicus) group, and the only species belonging to the subgenus Euprepiosaurus, which has prominent red-orange markings on its body. Proportions of the body and the construction of scales most closely resemble V. melinus, which can be found on the islands of Mangole and Taliabu. Most often, V. obor occurs in coastal sago palm swamps - a habitat that is underused by other species of the V. indicus group, but is also frequently encountered in riparian habitats and rainforests. It can reach lengths of 0.8 to 1.5 m in length and weigh between 0.5 and 1.5 kg. The lizard was named obor (meaning "torch" in Indonesian) due to its unique coloration.

The sago monitor  was first seen in the wild by Valter Weijola, who in March and April 2009 visited Sanana. One preserved specimen (the holotype), apparently collected between 1860 and 1866, is housed in Naturalis (formerly Rijksmuseum van Natuurlijke Historie, later Nationaal Natuurhistorisch Museum), Leiden, the Netherlands.

References

 

Varanus
Lizards of Asia
Reptiles of Indonesia
Reptiles described in 2010